Riama orcesi is a species of lizard in the family Gymnophthalmidae. The species is endemic to Ecuador.

Etymology
The specific name, orcesi, is in honor of Ecuadorian herpetologist Gustavo Orcés.

Geographic range

Reproduction
R. orcesi is oviparous.

References

Further reading
Doan TM, Castoe TA (2005). "Phylogenetic taxonomy of the Cercosaurini (Squamata: Gymnophthalmidae), with new genera for species of Neusticurus and Proctoporus ". Zoological Journal of the Linnean Society 143: 405–416. (Riama orcesi, new combination).
Kizirian DA (1995). "A New Species of Proctoporus (Squamata: Gymnophthalmidae) from the Andean Cordillera Oriental of Northeastern Ecuador". Journal of Herpetology 29 (1): 66–72. (Proctoporus orcesi, new species).

Riama
Reptiles of Ecuador
Endemic fauna of Ecuador
Reptiles described in 1995
Taxa named by David A. Kizirian